The Home Run Derby is an annual home run hitting competition in Major League Baseball (MLB) customarily held the day before the MLB All-Star Game, which places the contest on a Monday in July. A "home run" in the context of the competition, consists of hitting a baseball in fair territory out of the playing field on the fly. It differs from a home run hit during legal gameplay in that the batter is not competing against a pitcher and a defensive team attempting to make an out. In the Home Run Derby, all pitches are purposefully thrown slowly and at a closer range than the official  distance, usually by a coach behind a pitching screen. In addition, like batting practice, the batter remains in the batter's box after each swing, and does not run, nor circle the bases to score a run. 

The batter also does not have to conform to the usual league uniform standards, and as all pitches are tossed in the strike zone without any threat of beanballs, may choose to wear a regular baseball cap instead of a batting helmet. As the event traditionally takes place at sunset where the sun is of no factor to the batter, they can choose to wear their hat casually and backwards.

Since the inaugural derby in 1985, the event has seen several rule changes, evolving from a short outs-based competition, to multiple rounds, and eventually a bracket-style timed event.

History

The inspiration for the event was a 1960 TV series called Home Run Derby. The televised event included baseball legends Hank Aaron, Mickey Mantle, and Willie Mays. The show ran for 26 episodes with the winner receiving $2,000.

The event has grown significantly from its roots in the 1980s, when it was not televised. Prior to 1991, the Home Run Derby was structured as a two-inning event with each player receiving five outs per inning, allowing for the possibility of ties. It is now one of the most-watched events broadcast on ESPN.

In 2000, a "match play"-style format was instituted for the second round. The player with the most home runs in the first round faced the player with the least among the four qualifying players, as did the players with the second- and third-most totals. The contestant who won each matchup advanced to the finals. This format was discontinued after the 2003 competition.

The field of players selected currently consists of four American League players and four National League players. The first Derby in 1985 featured five from each league, and the 1986 and 1987 events featured three and two players from each league, respectively. In 1996, the field was again expanded to ten players, with five from each league (though in 1997, the AL had six contestants to the NL's four).

In 2000, the field reverted to the current four-player-per-league format. The only exception was 2005, when Major League Baseball changed the selection criteria so that eight players represented their home countries instead of their respective leagues. The change was believed to be in promotion of the inaugural World Baseball Classic, played in March 2006. In 2006, the selection of four players from each league resumed. In 2011, the format was revised so that team captains selected the individual sides.

For the first time in Derby history, Shohei Ohtani became both the first pitcher and the first Japanese player to participate in 2021.

Some notable performances in the Derby include Bobby Abreu in 2005, who won the Derby with a then-record 41 homers, including a then-record 24 in the first round. Vladimir Guerrero Jr. broke the first-round record in 2019 with 29 home runs. He broke that record in the following round, hitting 40 home runs in 2 tiebreakers. The previous overall record was set in 2016 by Giancarlo Stanton, who finished with a total of 61 home runs, defeating Todd Frazier in the final round. The current overall record is held by Guerrero Jr. at a mark of 91, set in 2019. Only three participants, Yoenis Céspedes, Stanton, and Pete Alonso, have won the Home Run Derby without being selected to the All-Star Game. Alonso broke Guerrero's first-round record in 2021 with 35 homers on his way to his second straight Derby Title (the first being in 2019 with a final round win over Guerrero).

Overview

Format
Eight players duel in a home run challenge.

1985–1990 
In the early years of the Home Run Derby, 4–10 players from both the AL and NL were selected to participate. Each player was given two "innings" to hit as many home runs as possible before reaching five outs. For the derby, an out is defined as any swing that is not a home run. The winner of the contest was the player with the most total home runs in the two innings.

1991–2005 
Beginning in 1991, the format changed to a 3-round contest. From 1991 to 2006, 8–10 players were selected and hit as many home runs as possible before reaching 10 outs in each round. The tally reset for each round, with the top four advancing to the second round, and the top two advancing to the final.

In honor of the World Baseball Classic, the 2005 contest featured eight players from different countries. The format remained the same.

2006–2013 
The format changed slightly in 2006. Instead of the tally resetting for each round, it was only reset before the final round. Therefore, the players with the four highest totals after Round 1 advanced to Round 2, and the players with the two highest sum of Round 1 and 2 advanced to the finals.

2014 
The Home Run Derby format was changed significantly in 2014, as MLB sought to speed-up the contest and increase the drama. In the new bracket format, five players from each league faced the other players in their league in Round 1, with each players having seven "outs". The player in each league with the highest Round 1 total received a second-round bye, and the players with the second- and third-highest Round 1 totals from each league faced off. The Round 2 winner from each league faced the Round 1 winner, and the Round 3 winner crowned the league winner. The final featured the winner of each league. Each round stands alone, with the score reset for each round. Ties in any round are broken by a 3-swing swing-off. If the players remain tied, the players engage in a sudden-death swing-off until one player homers.

2015-2019, since 2021
The format was changed once again in 2015. The most significant change was the elimination of "outs", which was replaced by a time limit. Eight players are seeded based on their season home run totals and are given five minutes to hit as many home runs as possible. The winner of each head-to-head matchup advances, until a final winner is determined. If a tie occurs in any match-up, two sets of tiebreakers are employed: first, a 1-minute swing-off decides the winner; thereafter, multiple swingoffs of 3 swings until a winner is determined. Further, a player can get "bonus time" in the last minute of each round. During that time, the clock would stop for each home run, and would not restart until a swing does not result in a home run. Additional bonus time could be earned for distance. Players who hit at least two home runs measuring at least  are given an extra minute of bonus time.

Weather concerns in 2015 led to a reduction in time from five minutes per round to four minutes. The clock was not stopped in the final minute, and one minute of bonus time was granted only for hitting two home runs of at least .

The four-minute round length was made permanent in 2016, while the minute of bonus time was reduced to 30 seconds and required two home runs of at least . The additional time was removed. Each batter is allowed one time-out during each round, and two in the finals.

For 2017 and 2018, the first tie-breaker was increased from a 1-minute swing off to  minutes. However, it was not needed either of these years. The swing off reverted to one minute in 2019, the first year in which it was used.

In 2021, the time limit was changed to three minutes plus a bonus of thirty seconds, with an additional thirty seconds of bonus time (for a total of one minute) added if a player hit a home run over 475 feet during regulation. In case of a tie, the contestants get one additional minute. If there still is a tie, each contestant gets three swings, and repeats on ties thereafter. In the final round, the finalists get two minutes.

For 2022, the additional bonus time requirements reverted back to two home runs of at least 440 feet. Separate from the regular home run derby, if the All-Star Game itself is tied after nine innings, a second home run derby will be held to determine the winner. This derby would be under somewhat different rules. It will not be timed, and each manager will pick three players to make three swings each to hit as many home runs as possible.

Gold balls
From 2005 to 2013, a gold ball has been used once a player reaches nine outs (in 2014 when the T-Mobile Ball came into play, six; since 2015, during the final minute). If a batter hit a home run using the golden ball, Century 21 Real Estate and Major League Baseball would donate $21,000 (a reference to the "21" in "Century 21") per home run to charity (MLB donated to the Boys and Girls Clubs of America, and Century 21 donated to Easter Seals). In both 2005 and 2006, $294,000 was raised for the charities, equaling fourteen golden ball home runs per year. State Farm continued this in 2007 as they designated $17,000 per home run (one dollar for each of State Farm's agencies), to the Boys and Girls Clubs of America. In the 2007 event, fifteen golden balls were hit for a donation of $255,000, and ten ($170,000) were hit in the 2008 event. For 2009, State Farm added $5,000 for all non-Gold Ball homers, and $517,000 was collected. For 2010, the non-Gold Ball homer was reduced to $3,000 per home run and a total of $453,000 was collected. Since 2014 any homer hit off a T-Mobile Ball resulted in a $10,000 donation to charity by T-Mobile and MLB, to Team Rubicon.

Television and radio coverage
On July 11, 1988, the day before the Major League Baseball All-Star Game from Cincinnati, TBS televised the annual All-Star Gala from the Cincinnati Zoo. Larry King hosted the broadcast with Craig Sager and Pete Van Wieren handling interviews. The broadcast's big draw would have been the Home Run Derby, which TBS intended on taping during the afternoon, and later airing it in prime time during the Gala coverage. Unfortunately, the derby and a skills competition were canceled due to rain.

The derby was first nationally televised by ESPN in 1993 on a same-day delayed basis, with the first live telecast in 1998. Although two hours are scheduled in programming listings for the telecast, it has rarely ever been contained to the timeslot and consistently runs three to four hours. Chris Berman has gained notoriety for his annual hosting duties on ESPN, including his catchphrase, "Back back back...Gone!". Berman starts this phrase when the ball is hit, and does not say "Gone!" until the ball lands.

The 2008 Derby was the year's most highly rated basic cable program.

Because of the game's TV popularity, invited players have felt pressure to participate. Notably, Ken Griffey Jr. initially quietly declined to take part in 1998, partly due to ESPN scheduling the Mariners in their late Sunday game the night before. After a discussion with ESPN's Joe Morgan and another with Hall of Famer Frank Robinson, Griffey changed his mind, and then won the Derby at Coors Field.

In Spanish, the event is televised on Spanish language network ESPN Deportes.

ESPN Radio also carries the event annually.

Most watched Home Run Derbys

Winners

Records

Most home runs in a single round
Note: these numbers include swingoffs.

Most single-derby home runs
Note: these numbers include swingoffs.

Most all-time home runs
Note: these numbers include swingoffs.

Wins by team

 *In 1986, Wally Joyner of the California Angels and Darryl Strawberry of the New York Mets were declared co-champions.
 *In 1989, Eric Davis of the Cincinnati Reds and Ruben Sierra of the Texas Rangers were declared co-champions.

Complete scoreboard

1980s

1985

1986

1987

1988

Home Run Derby canceled due to rain.

1989

1990s

1990

1991

1992

1993

* Lost in playoff to Gonzalez

1994

1995

* Beat Belle in finals

1996

1997

* Beat Walker in finals

1998

1999

* Lost to Burnitz in round 2

2000s

2000

2001

2002

* Giambi defeated Konerko in a swing off

2003

2004

2005

* Total rounds record.

2006

2007

Notes:
Recorded only seven of ten outs before hitting winning home run. 
Italicized numbers denote swing-offs.

2008

Notes:
New single round record. 
Voluntarily ended round with four outs.

2009 

Notes:
Italicized numbers denote swing-offs.

2010s

2010

2011 

Notes:
Italicized numbers denote swing-offs.

2012

Notes:
Italicized numbers denote swing-offs.

2013

Note:
Recorded only five of ten outs before hitting winning home run.

2014

* designates bye round.
(designates swing off home runs).

2015

2016

2017

2018

2019

* Round went into three swing-offs after Guerrero Jr. and Pederson were tied with 29 home runs each.

2020s

2020
Home Run Derby canceled due to COVID-19 pandemic.

2021

*Went to a three-pitch swing-off after Soto and Ohtani tied at 22 home runs in first attempt and 28 home runs in tiebreaker. Soto went first and homered on all three pitches; Going second, Ohtani failed to hit a home run on his first pitch and was thus eliminated.

2022 
* Round went into a swing-off after Pujols and Schwarber were tied 13–13 after regulation.

See also
List of Major League Baseball All-Star Games
MLB Home Run Derby X, a global tournament started in 2022

References

External links
 MLB.com: Home Run Derby History
 Baseball-Almanac.com: Home Run Derby Results and Analysis
 Baseball Research Journal, SABR, "Home Run Derby Curse, Fact or Fiction?" by Joseph McCollum and Marcus Jaiclin

Recurring events established in 1985
Major League Baseball competitions
 
Sports entertainment
Annual events in Major League Baseball
1985 establishments in the United States